On 4 September 2020, an explosion in Baitus Salat Jame mosque in Narayanganj District, Bangladesh killed at least 31 people while dozens more were injured. The death toll rose to 31 on 10 September.

Causes
The explosion is presumed to have been caused by a gas leak from an underground pipeline. At around 8:30 pm local time, all the six air conditioning units installed on the ground floor exploded simultaneously. Earlier, there were power outages in the mosque and a sudden surge of electricity caused sparks on the air conditioners which may have led to the explosion.

See also
 List of explosions

References

2020 disasters in Bangladesh
2020 fires in Asia
2020 in Bangladesh
Disasters in religious buildings and structures
Explosions in 2020
Explosions in Bangladesh
Fires in Bangladesh
Narayanganj Sadar Upazila
September 2020 events in Bangladesh